An Yulong (born 23 July 1978) is a Chinese short track speed skater, who won medals in the 500 m and 5000 m relay at the 1998 Winter Olympics. He also skated for the bronze medal-winning relay team at the 2002 Winter Olympics.

References

External links
Database Olympics

1978 births
Living people
Chinese male short track speed skaters
Olympic short track speed skaters of China
Olympic silver medalists for China
Olympic bronze medalists for China
Olympic medalists in short track speed skating
Short track speed skaters at the 1998 Winter Olympics
Short track speed skaters at the 2002 Winter Olympics
Medalists at the 1998 Winter Olympics
Medalists at the 2002 Winter Olympics
Asian Games medalists in short track speed skating
Short track speed skaters at the 1999 Asian Winter Games
Sportspeople from Jilin City
Medalists at the 1999 Asian Winter Games
Asian Games gold medalists for China
Universiade medalists in short track speed skating
World Short Track Speed Skating Championships medalists
Universiade bronze medalists for China
Competitors at the 1997 Winter Universiade
20th-century Chinese people